List of MPs elected in the 1974 United Kingdom general election may refer to the results of either of two elections that year:

List of MPs elected in the February 1974 United Kingdom general election
List of MPs elected in the October 1974 United Kingdom general election

See also
 1974 United Kingdom general election